Ho-jun, also spelled Ho-joon, is a Korean masculine given name. Its meaning differs based on the hanja used to write each syllable of the name. There are 49 hanja with the reading "ho" and 34 hanja with the reading "jun" on the South Korean government's official list of hanja which may be registered for use in given names. 

People with this given name include:
Ri Ho-jun (born 1946), North Korean sports shooter
Lee Ho-joon (baseball) (born 1976), South Korean baseball player
Kim Ho-jun (born 1984), South Korean footballer
Son Ho-jun (born 1984), South Korean singer and actor
Yoo Ho-joon (born 1985), South Korean football player
Kim Ho-jun (born 1990), South Korean snowboarder

See also
List of Korean given names

References

Korean masculine given names